Howard Hyde Russell (October 21, 1855 – June 30, 1946) was an American lawyer and clergyman, the founder of the Anti-Saloon League.

Biography
Howard Hyde Russell was born in Stillwater, Minnesota on October 21, 1855. He was educated at Griswold College and the Iowa College of Law, and worked as a lawyer in Corning for six years. He married Lillian Davis on August 17, 1880, and they had two children.

Following a religious conversion, he gave up the practice of law to become a minister, studying theology at Oberlin College for five years.

In 1893, he organized the Ohio Anti-Saloon League. In 1895, when the Anti-Saloon League was established at the national level, Russell was elected  superintendent. He mentored future leaders of the league, including Wayne Wheeler and Ernest Cherrington.

Russell also established the Lincoln-Lee Legion to promote the signing of temperance pledges by children and other young people. He is reported to have raised five million dollars to promote the temperance movement.

Russell was also the author of A Lawyer's Examination of the Bible, which is a work of Christian apologetics that argues the evidences for the Bible's authenticity concerning the life, teachings, death and resurrection of Jesus Christ. Russell believed that the testimony of the writers of the gospels could be tested by technical legal criteria and argued that such testimony was trustworthy. In this respect, he followed the arguments presented by the 19th century Harvard Law School professor Simon Greenleaf in his book The Testimony of the Evangelist. Russell's book was first published in 1893 and then re-released in 1935.

He died at his home in Westerville, Ohio on June 30, 1946.

Ernie Pyle devotes an entire chapter to Mr. Russell in his book, Home Country.

References

 Aaron, Paul, and Musto, David. Temperance and Prohibition in America: An Historical Overview. In: Moore, Mark H., and Gerstein, Dean R. (eds.) Alcohol and Public Policy: Beyond the Shadow of Prohibition. Washington, DC: National Academy Press, 1981. pp. 127–180.
 Asbury, Herbert. The Great Illusion; An Informal History of Prohibition. NY: Doubledsay, 1950.
 Blocker, Jack S. American Temperance Movements: Cycles of Reform. Boston: Twayne, 1989.
 Odegard, Peter H.  Pressure Politics: The Story of the Anti-Saloon League. NY: Columbia University Press, 1928.
 Russell, Howard Hyde. A Lawyer's Examination of the Bible. Westerville: Bible Bond, 1935. (Originally released in 1909 by Fleming H. Revell Company).
 Timberlake, James H. Prohibition and the Progressive Movements,: 1900-1920. Cambridge, MA: Harvard University Press, 1963.
 Westerville (Ohio) Public Library. Leaders: Howard Hyde Russell. Westerville Public Library website.

External links
 Howard Hyde Russell  (Westerville Public Library)

1855 births
1946 deaths
American temperance activists
Christian apologists
American Congregationalist ministers
American male writers
Oberlin College alumni
University of Iowa College of Law alumni